1989 in sports describes the year's events in world sport.

Alpine skiing
 Alpine Skiing World Cup
 Men's overall season champion: Marc Girardelli, Luxembourg
 Women's overall season champion: Vreni Schneider, Switzerland

American football
 Super Bowl XXIII – the San Francisco 49ers (NFC) won 20–16 over the Cincinnati Bengals (AFC)
Location: Joe Robbie Stadium
Attendance: 75,129
MVP: Jerry Rice, WR (San Francisco)
 January 2 - Fiesta Bowl (1988 season):
 The Notre Dame Fighting Irish won 34-21 over the West Virginia Mountaineers to win the national championship

Artistic gymnastics
 World Artistic Gymnastics Championships –
 Men's all-around champion: Igor Korobchinsky, USSR
 Women's all-around champion: Svetlana Boginskaya, USSR
 Men's team competition champion: USSR
 Women's team competition champion: USSR

Association football

Australian rules football
 Victorian Football League
 May 6 – Geelong kicks the highest losing score in VFL/AFL history, kicking 25.13 (163) to Hawthorn’s 26.15 (171)
 June 24 – Essendon kicks the lowest winning score since the 1927 Grand Final, beating Footscray 3.10 (28) to 3.5 (23).
 Hawthorn wins the 93rd VFL Premiership beating Geelong 21.18 (144) d 21.12 (138)
 Brownlow Medal awarded to Paul Couch (Geelong)

Baseball
 April 8 – One-handed pitcher Jim Abbott makes his major-league debut with the California Angels, without spending a single day in the minor leagues. He went on to a 12–12 record for the season.
 August 10 – Ten months after undergoing surgery for cancer in his pitching arm, San Francisco Giants pitcher Dave Dravecky returns to the major leagues, winning his comeback 4–3.
 August 15 – Dave Dravecky's comeback bid ends when his pitching arm breaks in the sixth inning of his second start. Two years later, the cancer-stricken arm would be amputated.
 August 24 – Following an investigation that he gambled on baseball, superstar player Pete Rose is banned from baseball for life.
 World Series – Oakland Athletics won 4 games to 0 over the San Francisco Giants in a series that was delayed because of the 1989 Loma Prieta earthquake. The Series MVP was Dave Stewart, Oakland.
 Taiwan Professional Baseball League, officially founded on October 23.

Basketball
 NCAA Men's Basketball Championship –
 Michigan wins 80–79 over Seton Hall in overtime
 NBA Finals –
 The Detroit Pistons win 4 games to 0 over the Los Angeles Lakers to win the franchise's first championship.
 National Basketball League (Australia) Finals:
 North Melbourne Giants defeated the Canberra Cannons 2–1 in the best-of-three final series.

Boxing
 February 11 – In Grenoble, France, Rene Jacquot won a 12-round decision over Donald Curry to win the World Welterweight Championship
 May 29 to June 3 – 28th European Amateur Boxing Championships held in Athens, Greece

Canadian football
 Grey Cup – Saskatchewan Roughriders won 43–40 over the Hamilton Tiger-Cats
 Vanier Cup – Western Ontario Mustangs won 35–10 over the Saskatchewan Huskies

Cycling
 Giro d'Italia won by Laurent Fignon of France
 Tour de France – Greg LeMond of the United States
 UCI Road World Championships – Men's road race – Greg LeMond of the United States

Dogsled racing
 Iditarod Trail Sled Dog Race Champion –
 Joe Runyan won with lead dogs: Rambo & Ferlin the Husky

Field hockey
 Men's Champions Trophy: Australia
 Women's Champions Trophy: South Korea

Figure skating
 World Figure Skating Championships –
 Men's champion: Kurt Browning, Canada
 Ladies’ champion: Midori Ito, Japan
 Pair skating champions: Ekaterina Gordeeva & Sergei Grinkov, Soviet Union
 Ice dancing champions: Marina Klimova / Sergei Ponomarenko, Soviet Union

Gaelic Athletic Association
 Camogie
 All-Ireland Camogie Champion: Kilkenny
 National Camogie League: Kilkenny
 Gaelic football
 All-Ireland Senior Football Championship – Cork 0–17 died Mayo 1–11
 National Football League – Cork 0–15 died Dublin 0–12
 Ladies' Gaelic football
 All-Ireland Senior Football Champion: Kerry
 National Football League: Kerry
 Hurling
 All-Ireland Senior Hurling Championship – Tipperary 4–24 died Antrim 3–9
 National Hurling League – Galway 2–16 beat Tipperary 4–8

Golf
Men's professional
 Masters Tournament – Nick Faldo
 U.S. Open – Curtis Strange
 British Open – Mark Calcavecchia
 PGA Championship – Payne Stewart
 PGA Tour money leader – Tom Kite – $1,395,278
 Senior PGA Tour money leader – Bob Charles – $725,887
 Ryder Cup – Europe and the United States teams tied 14–14 in team golf.
Men's amateur
 British Amateur – Stephen Dodd
 U.S. Amateur – Chris Patton
 European Amateur – David Ecob
Women's professional
 Nabisco Dinah Shore – Juli Inkster
 LPGA Championship – Nancy Lopez
 U.S. Women's Open – Betsy King
 Classique du Maurier – Tammie Green
 LPGA Tour money leader – Betsy King – $654,132

Harness racing
 North America Cup – Goalie Jeff
 United States Pacing Triple Crown races –
 Cane Pace – Dancing Master
 Little Brown Jug – Goalie Jeff
 Messenger Stakes – Sandman Hanover
 United States Trotting Triple Crown races –
 Hambletonian – Park Ave Joe & Probe (dead heat)
 Yonkers Trot – Valley Victory
 Kentucky Futurity – Peace Corps
 Australian Inter Dominion Harness Racing Championship –
 Pacers: Jodie's Babe
 Trotters: Yankee Loch

Horse racing
Steeplechases
 Cheltenham Gold Cup – Desert Orchid
 Grand National – Little Polveir
Flat races
 Australia – Melbourne Cup won by Tawrrific
 Canadian Triple Crown Races:
 Queen's Plate – With Approval
 Prince of Wales Stakes – With Approval
 Breeders' Stakes – With Approval
 With Approval becomes the first horse to win the Canadian Triple Crown since 1963.
 France – Prix de l'Arc de Triomphe won by Carroll House
 Ireland – Irish Derby Stakes won by Old Vic
 Japan – Japan Cup won by Horlicks
 English Triple Crown Races:
 2,000 Guineas Stakes – Nashwan
 The Derby – Nashwan
 St. Leger Stakes – Michelozzo
 United States Triple Crown Races:
 May 6 – Kentucky Derby – Sunday Silence
 Preakness Stakes – Sunday Silence
 Belmont Stakes – Easy Goer
 Breeders' Cup World Thoroughbred Championships:
 Breeders' Cup Classic – Sunday Silence
 Breeders' Cup Distaff – Bayakoa
 Breeders' Cup Juvenile – Rhythm
 Breeders' Cup Juvenile Fillies – Go for Wand
 Breeders' Cup Mile – Steinlen
 Breeders' Cup Sprint – Dancing Spree
 Breeders' Cup Turf – Prized

Ice hockey
 Art Ross Trophy as the NHL's leading scorer during the regular season: Mario Lemieux, Pittsburgh Penguins
 March 22 – St. Louis Blues’ Steve Tuttle slits the jugular vein of Buffalo Sabres’ goaltender Clint Malarchuk, with a total of 300 stitches needed to close the wound thanks to trainer Jim Pizzutelli.
 Hart Memorial Trophy for the NHL’s Most Valuable Player: Wayne Gretzky, Los Angeles Kings
 Stanley Cup – The Calgary Flames won 4 games to 2 over the Montreal Canadiens. This constitutes the only time that the visiting team won the cup at the Montreal Forum against the Canadiens.
 World Hockey Championship
 Men's champion: Soviet Union defeated Canada
 Junior Men's champion: Soviet Union defeated Sweden

Lacrosse
 The Philadelphia Wings defeat the New York Saints to win the Major Indoor Lacrosse League championship

Motorsport

Radiosport
 Second European High Speed Telegraphy Championship held in Hanover, Germany.

Rugby league
 June 7 – 1989 Panasonic Cup tournament final: Brisbane Broncos 22–20 Illawarra Steelers at Parramatta Stadium
 June 14 – 1989 State of Origin title is wrapped up by Queensland in Game Two of the three-match series against New South Wales at the Sydney Football Stadium before 40,000.
 July 23 – first of the 1989–1992 World Cup's twenty tournament matches is won by Australia 22–14 over New Zealand at Mount Smart Stadium before 15,000
 September 24 – 1989 NSWRL season Grand Final: Canberra Raiders 19–14 Balmain Tigers at Sydney Football Stadium before 40,500.
 October 4 – 1989 World Club Challenge match is won by Widnes who defeats Canberra Raiders 30–18 at Old Trafford before 30,768

Rugby union
 95th Five Nations Championship series is won by France

Snooker
 World Snooker Championship – Steve Davis beats John Parrott 18–3
 World rankings – Steve Davis remains world number one for 1989/90

Swimming
 Third Pan Pacific Championships, held in Tokyo, Japan (August 17 – 20)
 August 20 – Tom Jager once again regains the world record (22.14) in the 50m freestyle (long course) during 1989 Pan Pacific Swimming Championships, with a time of 22.12.

Taekwondo
 World Championships held in Seoul, South Korea

Tennis
 Grand Slam in tennis men's results:
 Australian Open – Ivan Lendl
 French Open – Michael Chang
 Wimbledon championships – Boris Becker
 U.S. Open – Boris Becker
 Grand Slam in tennis women's results:
 Australian Open – Steffi Graf
 French Open – Arantxa Sánchez Vicario
 Wimbledon championships – Steffi Graf
 U.S. Open – Steffi Graf
 Davis Cup – Germany F.R. won 3–2 over Sweden in world tennis.

Triathlon
 1989 ITU Triathlon World Championships held in Avignon, France
 ETU European Championships held in Cascais, Portugal

Volleyball
 1989 FIVB Men's World Cup won by Cuba
 1989 FIVB Women's World Cup won by Cuba
 1989 Men's European Volleyball Championship won by Italy
 1989 Women's European Volleyball Championship won by USSR

Water polo
 Men's Water Polo World Cup won by Yugoslavia
 Men's European Water Polo Championship won by West Germany
 Women's European Water Polo Championship won by the Netherlands

Multi-sport events
 Third World Games held in Karlsruhe, West Germany
 15th Summer Universiade held in Duisburg, West Germany
 Fourteenth Winter Universiade held in Sofia, Bulgaria

Awards
 Associated Press Male Athlete of the Year – Joe Montana, National Football League
 Associated Press Female Athlete of the Year – Steffi Graf, Tennis

References

 
Sports by year